Joseph Daigle may refer to:

Joseph Daigle (New Brunswick politician) (born 1934)
Joseph Daigle (Quebec politician) (1846–1907)